Terentyev (also spelled Terentjev or Tsyarentsyew), or Terentyeva (feminine; Терентьева), is a Russian surname. Notable people with the surname include:

Aleksandr Terentyev (chemist) (1891–1970), a Soviet organic chemist
Alyaksandr Tsyarentsyew (born 1981), a Belarusian footballer
Denis Terentyev (born 1992), Russian football player
Flor Terentyev (? - after 1700), a Russian bellmaker of the late 17th – early 18th century
Fyodor Terentyev (1925–1963), a Soviet cross-country skier
Kirill Terentyev (born 1979), Russian football player
Maksim Terentyev (born 1992), Russian football player
Nikolay Terentyev (born 1996), Russian sledge hockey player
Nonna Terentyeva (1942–1996), a Soviet/Russian actress
Pavel Terentyev (1903–1970), a Soviet zoologist
Sergey Terentyev (born 1964), a Russian musician and ex-member of Aria

Russian-language surnames